Yuriy Nikulin  (January 8, 1931 – 1988) was a Soviet hammer thrower. He was born in Moscow. He competed for the USSR in the 1960 Summer Olympics and 1964 Summer Olympics. His son Igor would also take up the hammer, taking an Olympic bronze medal for the United Team in 1992.

References

External links

 Profile at sport-strana.ru

1931 births
1988 deaths
Soviet male hammer throwers
Athletes (track and field) at the 1960 Summer Olympics
Athletes (track and field) at the 1964 Summer Olympics
Olympic athletes of the Soviet Union